Gabriel Mena (1470-1528) was a Spanish poet, composer, musician and singer. He was cantor of the chapel of Fernando el Católico until the king's death in 1516.

References

1528 deaths
Year of birth unknown
Renaissance composers
Spanish male classical composers
Spanish classical composers
1470 births